This is a list of past and present rolling stock used on the Talyllyn Railway, a  narrow gauge preserved railway line running for  from Tywyn on the Mid-Wales coast to Nant Gwernol near the village of Abergynolwyn. The line was opened in 1866 to carry slate from the quarries at Bryn Eglwys to Tywyn, and was the first narrow gauge railway in Britain authorised by Act of Parliament to carry passengers using steam haulage. Despite severe under-investment, the line remained open, and in 1951 it became the first railway in the world to be preserved as a heritage railway by volunteers.

When first opened, the railway owned two steam locomotives, Talyllyn and Dolgoch, and five carriages, including one brake van. There were no additions to the rolling stock until the line was taken over in 1951. Two ex-Corris Railway locomotives were then purchased from British Railways, and subsequent additions have brought the total up to six steam locomotives, four diesels and twenty-three carriages.

Locomotives 
The railway has six steam locomotives for passenger trains and four diesel locomotives that usually haul only works trains. It is unusual for all steam locomotives to be operable at one time, as there is usually at least one locomotive undergoing an overhaul. In the early days of preservation Rev. W Awdry, the author of the Railway Series books, visited the railway on a family holiday and became involved as a volunteer soon afterwards. He, and later his son Christopher, wrote the Talyllyn Railway into the books as the Skarloey Railway, and most locomotives on the Talyllyn have a fictional counterpart in that series. These are listed in the right hand column.

Steam locomotives

Diesel locomotives

Self-propelled engineering vehicles

Former locomotives and engineering vehicles

Visiting locomotives 
 there have only been two visiting locomotives capable of running on the Talyllyn Railway's unusual gauge. These are Motor Rail Simplex diesel No. 5 Alan Meaden and Winson Engineering and Drayton Designs No. 7 Tattoo class design similar to the Talyllyn's No. 4. Both these are locomotives from the Corris Railway.

In July 2015 a gala was held to mark the railway's 150th anniversary, and two  gauge locomotives visited the railway: George England and Co. locomotive Prince from the Ffestiniog Railway and Hunslet Engine Company Russell from the Welsh Highland Heritage Railway, both in Porthmadog.

In July 2016, another gala was held, with three visiting locos, all built by Fletcher, Jennings and Co. Together with Talyllyn and Dolgoch, this was an assembly of all five surviving locos in the UK built by this firm. As with the previous gala, temporary track was laid due to the differing gauges. One of the locomotives, Captain Baxter, ran on a short section of standard gauge track. The other two Fletcher Jennings locomotives, William Finlay and Townsend Hook, were static exhibits only and are therefore not listed below. William Finlay remained at Tywyn after the event and is now on display at the Narrow Gauge Railway Museum.

In September 2021, to mark the centenary of No. 4, Corris Railway No. 7 made another visit to the Talyllyn, along with the other preserved Kerr Stuart Tattoo class, Stanhope, and Sirdar class Diana. Stanhope and Diana ran on temporary  track laid at Wharf station, and No. 7 pulled several trains along the full length of the line.

Carriages
The Talyllyn railway has a total of 22 carriages. The first five are the original carriages built for the railway, though they were not provided with numbers until preservation in 1951. After that time, the remaining carriages were built by the railway or acquired from elsewhere. With the exception of ex-Corris carriage No. 17, all the bogie coaches were built for the railway after preservation; the smaller four wheeled coaches are generally older.

All the stock is third class only, unless otherwise stated. Where two figures are given for the number of seats, the larger figure is the maximum number of passengers than can be carried in a heavily loaded train.

Four wheeled carriages

Bogie carriages

Former carriages

Goods wagons
The Talyllyn Railway was primarily constructed for conveying slate. Prior to the beginning of the 20th century, the railway owned over 115 wagons, mainly slate wagons, but also a number of other general and special purpose goods wagons. Some of these survived into the preservation era, and since then a large number of additional wagons have been purchased and built. The following table lists the main types of wagon currently in use:

Narrow Gauge Railway Museum rolling stock

The Narrow Gauge Railway Museum is a purpose-built museum dedicated to narrow gauge railways situated on the Tywyn Wharf station. It owns several wagons formerly in use on the railway (listed above), as well as rolling stock and other artefacts from other narrow gauge railways around the world. The wagons are still used occasionally on the Talyllyn.

Liveries

The standard livery for locomotives on the Talyllyn is deep bronze green, lined in black and yellow, although since the 1980s there has been a policy of varying some of the liveries for a period of time. Previously, No. 1 and No. 2 carried lined black and TR red liveries respectively. No. 2 Dolgoch had for a time carried Atlas green livery in preservation.

The liveries carried by the steam locomotives as of 2018 are as follows:-

No. 1: Indian Red. This is believed to be the livery applied to Nos. 1 and 2 when first built.
No. 2: Indian Red.
No. 3: Standard Talyllyn green with standard lining. Burnished motion and Black background to Builders/Name/Number plates.
No. 4: Standard Talyllyn green with standard lining. Burnished motion and Black background to Builders/Name/Number plates.
No. 6: RAF blue.
No. 7: Standard Talyllyn green with standard lining. Burnished motion and Black background to Builders/Name/Number plates.

The vintage rolling stock and the carriages built for the line after preservation are cherry red, lined with deep bronze green. Additionally, the railway has preserved rolling stock from other railways. These retain their original liveries.

The Corris coach (Talyllyn No. 17) and brake van (Talyllyn No. 6) are brown lined with gold leaf and the two Glyn Valley Tramway coaches (Talyllyn Nos. 14 and 15) are green lined with white.

Notes

References

Bibliography

External links

Talyllyn Railway website
Narrow Gauge Railway Museum

Rolling stock
United Kingdom narrow gauge rolling stock
British railway-related lists
Wales transport-related lists
Talyllyn Railway